Garinish Island (Garinis in Irish, meaning 'The near island') can refer to:

 Garinish Island (County Cork) - island in County Cork
 Garinish Island (County Kerry) - island and townland in County Kerry